Bunpichmorakat Kheun (born 28 August 2006) is a Cambodian swimmer. She represented Cambodia at the 2020 Summer Olympics in the women's 50 metre freestyle and was one of two flag bearers for Cambodia in the opening ceremony.

References

External links
 

Living people
2006 births
Cambodian female freestyle swimmers
Olympic swimmers of Cambodia
Swimmers at the 2020 Summer Olympics